Neuburg am Inn is a municipality in the district of Passau in Bavaria in Germany.

Geography

Geographical Location 
Neuburg am Inn is located in the Danube-region forest high above the river Inn, which forms the natural border with Upper Austria. In 2006, a bridge over the Inn was opened to pedestrians and cyclists, which now connects Neuburg to the opposite bank. By Neuburg is the major road B 12, which connects it to the city of Passau 10 km further north and a further 15-kilometer link to Pocking. Just 6 km from the community is the motorway junction ‘’Passau-south’’, a link to the Autobahn 3. Also nearby is the district of Neukirchen am Inn, a frequent stop for the train from Passau to Mühldorf.

Community Structure 
The municipality has 22 Neuburg am Inn officially named districts:

There are also the municipal areas Eglsee, Neuburg a. Inn, Neukirchen am Inn and Engertsham.

Neighboring Communities 
 Fürstenzell
 Ruhstorf an der Rott
 Neuhaus am Inn

History 
It is assumed that the castle was built around the year 1050.
The  Neuburg am Inn formerly belonged to the Habsburg count of Neuburg. In the 13th century the Duke of Bavaria attempted to claim the fortress, but it was successfully defended in the name of the Count of Neuburg.  Austria later purchased the sovereignty here through the Bishopric of Passau, acquired it in 1730/39.
Since 1803 it has belonged to Bavaria.

People, politics and culture

Population development 
 1970: 3.008 inhabitants
 1987: 3.257 inhabitants
 2000: 3.846 inhabitants
 2010: 4,216 inhabitants

Council 

The council has been working the local elections on 2 March 2008 as follows:
 CSU: 10 seats (58,5% der Stimmen)
 Freie Wähler/Bürgerliste: 3 seats (17,5% der Stimmen)
 Green: 2 seats (12,7% der Stimmen)
 SPD: 1 seat (11,2% der Stimmen)

Mayor 
The most recent mayors were:
2002–2014: Joseph Stöcker (CSU)
since 2014: Wolfgang Lindmeier (CSU)

Community partnerships 
Neuburg am Inn has partnered with the Upper Austrian town Wernstein.

Arts and culture 
Neuburg Castle
Trinity Church in nearby Dommelstadl

Notable people 
Ignaz Auer (1846–1907), born in Dommelstadl, politician (SPD), member of the Reichstag
Erhard Auer (1874–1945), born in Dommelstadl, Bavarian politician (SPD), member of the Landtag of Bavaria, First Minister of the Free State of Bavaria, SPD party leader in Bavaria

Economy and Infrastructure

Economy, agriculture and forestry 
In 1998 there were 12,278 people working In the field of agriculture and forestry, and 153 people working in the production sector in trade and transport. In other sectors, 341 persons were employed on social security contributions. There were 5 companies in the construction industry. In addition, in 1999 there were 106 farms with an agricultural area of 1477 hectares, of which 1023 were acres of arable land and 442 hectares of permanent pasture area.

Education 
The following facilities exist as of 1999:
Kindergartens: 150 kindergartens with 140 children
Primary schools: 1 with 11 teachers and 210 students

Telecommunications 
90 meter high telecommunications tower of Deutsche Telekom AG of reinforced concrete at Dommelstadl (Geographical coordinates: 48 ° 32'3 "N 13 ° 24'9" W), broadcasting over 102.1Mhz.

References

Passau (district)